Constance Hunting (1925 – April 5, 2006) was an American poet and publisher,  widely known in the Northeastern United States. She taught English literature and creative writing at the University of Maine at Orono until her death on April 5th, 2006.

Hunting received her B.A. from Pembroke College in Brown University in 1947, studied at Duke University from 1950–1953, and then lived in West Lafayette, IN, home of Purdue University, until 1968. From that time, she lived in Orono, Maine with her husband Robert, who was Chair of the English department at UMO until his retirement.

Hunting trained as a classical pianist, but is best known for her work as a poet, and her promotion of other Maine writers through the Puckerbrush Review literary magazine, which she established in 1971. She was also the founder and editor of Puckerbrush Press, which, over the twenty-eight years of its existence, published a great variety of work by many writers, domestic and international, including May Sarton, James Kelman, Angelica Garnett, and other figures from the Bloomsbury Group.

Works 
 After the Stravinsky Concert and Other Poems (1969)
 Cimmerian and Other Poems (1972)
 Beyond the Summerhouse: A Narrative Poem (1976) 
 Nightwalk and Other Poems (1980) 
 Dream Cities (1982) 
 Collected Poems 1969–1982 (1983) 
 A Day at the Shore: A Poem (1983)
 Between the Worlds: Poems 1983–1988 (1989)  
 Hawkedon (1990)  
 The Myth of Horizon (1991) 
 At Rochebonne: A Poem (1994)
 The Shape of Memory (1998) 
 Natural Things: Collected Poems 1969–1998 (1999) 
 An Amazement (2002)
 The Sky Flower (2005) 

Her papers are currently housed at the Howard Gotlieb Archival Research Center at Boston University.

External links
 Feature on Hunting from UMaine Today magazine
 Hunting interviewed by Sandy Phippen on MPBN's "A Good Read"

1925 births
2006 deaths
Pembroke College in Brown University alumni
Brown University alumni
Duke University alumni
People from Orono, Maine
University of Maine faculty
Writers from Rhode Island
Purdue University faculty
People from West Lafayette, Indiana